Confederación Española de Organizaciones Empresariales (Spanish Confederation of Employers' Organizations), or CEOE, is a Spanish institution founded in June 1977 that represents the Spanish business community. It includes state-owned and private companies in all sectors. It's a member of BusinessEurope.

Chairs 
 Carles Ferrer i Salat (1977–1984)
 José María Cuevas (1984–2007)
 Gerardo Díaz Ferrán (2007 - 2010)
 Joan Rosell (2010 - 2018)
 Antonio Garamendi (2018 - )

External links 
 Confederación Española de Organizaciones Empresariales

Employers' organizations
Business organisations based in Spain